Giovanni Scappaticci (born 10 September 1987) is a former Italian footballer.

Biography
Scappaticci was a youth product of Pescara. He made his Serie B debut during 2006–07 Serie B season. In 2008, he left for Melfi in a temporary deal. On 10 January 2009 Scappaticci returned to Pescara. On 6 August Scappaticci was signed by Cassino along with Giovanni Indiveri.

On 30 January 2011 he was signed by Giulianova.

References

External links
 AIC profile (data by football.it) 

Italian footballers
Delfino Pescara 1936 players
A.S. Melfi players
A.S.D. Cassino Calcio 1924 players
Giulianova Calcio players
Serie B players
Serie C players
People from Frosinone
Footballers from Lazio
1987 births
Living people
Association football midfielders
Sportspeople from the Province of Frosinone